Lionell Spruill Sr. (born December 28, 1946, in South Norfolk, now Chesapeake, Virginia) is an American politician. A Democrat, Spruill has represented the 5th district of the Virginia Senate since 2017. Between 1994 and 2016, he was a member of the Virginia House of Delegates for the 77th district, made up of parts of the cities of Chesapeake and Suffolk.

Notes

References

External links

1946 births
Living people
Democratic Party members of the Virginia House of Delegates
Democratic Party Virginia state senators
Norfolk State University alumni
Politicians from Chesapeake, Virginia
21st-century American politicians